Siglap Single Member Constituency was a constituency spanning Chinatown and Raffles Place in Singapore. It used to exist from 1959 to 1988 as Siglap Constituency and was renamed as Siglap Single Member Constituency (SMC) as part of Singapore's political reforms. The SMC was merged into Bedok Group Representation Constituency in 1991.

Member of Parliament

Elections

Elections in 1950s

Elections in 1960s

Elections in 1970s

Elections in 1980s

References
1984 GE's result
1980 GE's result
1976 GE's result
1972 GE's result
1968 GE's result
1963 GE's result
1959 GE's result
Brief History on Singapore Alliance

Bedok